Euphaedra karschi is a butterfly in the family Nymphalidae. It was described by Max Bartel in 1905. It is found in Cameroon and the Democratic Republic of the Congo.

Description
 
E. karschi Bartel, like xypete, has a white apical spot on the forewing and the greater part of the hindwing beneath red; the subapical band of the forewing is whitish, very narrow (about as in preussi) and sharply defined; it consists of 3 small anterior spots and a large one, placed more distally, in cellule 3. On the underside of the fore wing the subapical band is white and proximally only narrowly bordered with black; 
the under surface of the hindwing coloured and marked almost exactly as in the typical xypete. Probably only a form of the latter. North-West Cameroons.

Subspecies
Euphaedra karschi karschi (Cameroon, northern Democratic Republic of the Congo)
Euphaedra karschi sankuruensis Hecq, 1980 (central and southern Democratic Republic of the Congo)

Etymology
The specific name honours Ferdinand Karsch.

References

Butterflies described in 1905
karschi